XHPA-FM is a radio station on 93.7 FM in Acapulco, Guerrero, Mexico. It is operated by Grupo Radio Visión and carries a grupera format known as La Ke Buena.

History
XHPA received its concession on August 15, 1969.

Starting January 3, 2022, the four Radiorama stations in Acapulco (XHKOK, XHCI, XHNS, and XHPA) were leased to a new operator, Grupo Radio Visión. XHPA took on La Ke Buena format from Radiópolis.

References

Radio stations in Guerrero
Radio stations established in 1969